James Sedwards is an English guitarist, musician, and composer, working predominantly in alternative rock. Initially known for leading the band Nought (or "Nøught"), he has more recently been known as a collaborative musician on projects including the Thurston Moore Group, Guapo,  The Devil (with members of Country Teasers), Kish Mauve, Alex Ward & The Dead Ends, Zodiac Youth (with Youth and Zodiac Mindwarp), and Chrome Hoof. Sedwards also has ongoing improvisation duo work with drummer Jem Doulton.

Sedwards is noted for his guitar skills, having been a runner-up at the 1998 National Guitarist of the Year competition at Wembley, UK with the judges finding his composition and performance of the piece 'Cough Cap Kitty Cat' the "perfect blend of technical expertise and inventiveness." He also came in 2nd place in the first UK Riffathon in 2003, a nationwide guitar competition in aid of Action For Brazil’s Children Trust and judged by Jimmy Page and Brian May, where he played the 1973 live version of Led Zeppelin's 'Immigrant Song'.  On many of his projects, he plays bass guitar in addition to (or instead of) six-string guitar. He has also been noted for sometimes playing his guitar with a power drill.  John Peel infamously said that Sedwards is "the first person who's not a footballer that I've been jealous of."

References

External links
Nought homepage
Nought @ MySpace

The Devil Bandcamp site

Living people
British rock guitarists
Year of birth missing (living people)
Chrome Hoof members
Guapo (band) members
People educated at Abingdon School